The 1992–93 NBA season was the 25th season for the Seattle SuperSonics in the National Basketball Association. During the first month of the regular season, the Sonics acquired Vincent Askew from the Sacramento Kings. With George Karl in his second season as the SuperSonics coach, the team won their first four games of the season, which included two victories against the Houston Rockets in their first two games in Yokohama, Japan. At midseason, the team traded Benoit Benjamin and top draft pick Doug Christie to the Los Angeles Lakers in exchange for Sam Perkins. With a 33–17 record at the All-Star break, the Sonics won ten straight games between February and March, as they improved their 47–35 record from the previous season to 55–27, and reached the 1993 Playoffs as the #3 seed in the Western Conference.

Shawn Kemp averaged 17.8 points, 10.7 rebounds, 1.5 steals and 1.9 blocks per game, and was selected for the 1993 NBA All-Star Game, which was his first All-Star appearance, while Ricky Pierce led the team in scoring averaging 18.2 points per game, and Gary Payton provided the team with 13.5 points, 4.9 assists and 2.2 steals per game. In addition, sixth man Eddie Johnson contributed 14.4 points per game off the bench, while Derrick McKey provided with 13.4 points and 1.4 steals per game, and Michael Cage led the team with 8.0 rebounds per game. Payton also finished in sixth place in Most Improved Player voting.

In the Western Conference First Round of the playoffs, the Sonics trailed 2–1 to the Utah Jazz, but managed to defeat them in five games, then defeated the Rockets in seven games in the Western Conference Semi-finals, which included a 103–100 overtime home win in Game 7. However, the Sonics would then lose in the Western Conference Finals to the Charles Barkley-led Phoenix Suns in a full seven game series. The Suns would reach the NBA Finals, but would lose to the 2-time defending champion Chicago Bulls in six games.

Following the season, McKey was traded to the Indiana Pacers, and Johnson and Dana Barros were both dealt to the Charlotte Hornets, who then sent Barros to the Philadelphia 76ers two days later.

Draft picks

Roster

Depth chart

Regular season

Season standings

y – clinched division title
x – clinched playoff spot

z – clinched division title
y – clinched division title
x – clinched playoff spot

Record vs. opponents

Game log

Playoffs

|- align="center" bgcolor="#ccffcc"
| 1
| April 30
| Utah
| W 99–85
| Shawn Kemp (29)
| Shawn Kemp (17)
| Nate McMillan (9)
| Seattle Center Coliseum14,429
| 1–0
|- align="center" bgcolor="#ffcccc"
| 2
| May 2
| Utah
| L 85–89
| Gary Payton (19)
| Sam Perkins (10)
| Nate McMillan (7)
| Seattle Center Coliseum14,513
| 1–1
|- align="center" bgcolor="#ffcccc"
| 3
| May 4
| @ Utah
| L 80–90
| Perkins, Johnson (20)
| Perkins, Cage (9)
| Ricky Pierce (5)
| Delta Center19,911
| 1–2
|- align="center" bgcolor="#ccffcc"
| 4
| May 6
| @ Utah
| W 93–80
| Eddie Johnson (24)
| Shawn Kemp (11)
| McKey, Payton (6)
| Delta Center19,911
| 2–2
|- align="center" bgcolor="#ccffcc"
| 5
| May 8
| Utah
| W 100–92
| Sam Perkins (20)
| Sam Perkins (13)
| Gary Payton (7)
| Seattle Center Coliseum14,812
| 3–2
|-

|- align="center" bgcolor="#ccffcc"
| 1
| May 10
| Houston
| W 99–90
| Ricky Pierce (23)
| Shawn Kemp (11)
| Nate McMillan (10)
| Seattle Center Coliseum14,252
| 1–0
|- align="center" bgcolor="#ccffcc"
| 2
| May 12
| Houston
| W 111–100
| Sam Perkins (23)
| Michael Cage (14)
| Derrick McKey (7)
| Seattle Center Coliseum14,732
| 2–0
|- align="center" bgcolor="#ffcccc"
| 3
| May 15
| @ Houston
| L 79–97
| Shawn Kemp (12)
| Perkins, Cage (9)
| Nate McMillan (4)
| The Summit16,611
| 2–1
|- align="center" bgcolor="#ffcccc"
| 4
| May 16
| @ Houston
| L 92–103
| Shawn Kemp (23)
| Shawn Kemp (18)
| Nate McMillan (8)
| The Summit16,611
| 2–2
|- align="center" bgcolor="#ccffcc"
| 5
| May 18
| Houston
| W 120–95
| Ricky Pierce (24)
| Shawn Kemp (12)
| Nate McMillan (5)
| Seattle Center Coliseum14,433
| 3–2
|- align="center" bgcolor="#ffcccc"
| 6
| May 20
| @ Houston
| L 90–103
| Perkins, Payton (14)
| Shawn Kemp (9)
| three players tied (3)
| The Summit16,611
| 3–3
|- align="center" bgcolor="#ccffcc"
| 7
| May 22
| Houston
| W 103–100 (OT)
| Ricky Pierce (25)
| Shawn Kemp (11)
| Nate McMillan (6)
| Seattle Center Coliseum14,812
| 4–3
|-

|- align="center" bgcolor="#ffcccc"
| 1
| May 24
| @ Phoenix
| L 91–105
| Derrick McKey (17)
| Shawn Kemp (10)
| Nate McMillan (7)
| America West Arena19,023
| 0–1
|- align="center" bgcolor="#ccffcc"
| 2
| May 26
| @ Phoenix
| W 103–99
| Ricky Pierce (34)
| Nate McMillan (8)
| Nate McMillan (6)
| America West Arena19,023
| 1–1
|- align="center" bgcolor="#ffcccc"
| 3
| May 28
| Phoenix
| L 97–104
| Ricky Pierce (28)
| Shawn Kemp (12)
| Nate McMillan (5)
| Seattle Center Coliseum14,812
| 1–2
|- align="center" bgcolor="#ccffcc"
| 4
| May 30
| Phoenix
| W 120–101
| McKey, Kemp (20)
| Shawn Kemp (8)
| Derrick McKey (6)
| Seattle Center Coliseum14,812
| 2–2
|- align="center" bgcolor="#ffcccc"
| 5
| June 1
| @ Phoenix
| L 114–120
| Shawn Kemp (33)
| Perkins, Kemp (6)
| Gary Payton (8)
| America West Arena19,023
| 2–3
|- align="center" bgcolor="#ccffcc"
| 6
| June 3
| Phoenix
| W 118–102
| Ricky Pierce (27)
| Shawn Kemp (15)
| Derrick McKey (5)
| Seattle Center Coliseum14,812
| 3–3
|- align="center" bgcolor="#ffcccc"
| 7
| June 5
| @ Phoenix
| L 110–123
| Eddie Johnson (34)
| Shawn Kemp (8)
| Nate McMillan (7)
| America West Arena19,023
| 3–4
|-

Player statistics

Season

1. Statistics with the SuperSonics.

Playoffs

Awards and records

Awards
 Shawn Kemp was selected to play in the 1993 NBA All-Star Game for the West.

Records

Transactions

Overview

Trades

Free agents

Additions

Subtractions

Waivings

Player Transactions Citation:

See also
 1992–93 NBA season

References

Seattle SuperSonics seasons